The 2022–23 United Rugby Championship is the 22nd season of the professional rugby union competition United Rugby Championship. It began on 16 September 2022. For sponsorship reasons it is known in South Africa as Vodacom United Rugby Championship or Vodacom URC, while in the Northern Hemisphere it is known as the BKT United Rugby Championship or BKT URC.

Format
The tournament consists of 21 rounds; 18 rounds of regular season play, followed by three rounds of play-offs. 

There are four regional pools: The Irish Shield pool (featuring the four Irish teams), the Welsh Shield pool (featuring the four Welsh teams), the South African Shield pool (featuring the four South African teams) and the Scottish/Italian 'Azzurri/Blue' Shield pool (featuring the two Italian and two Scottish sides). Teams play six matches against their regional pool rivals home and away. The remaining twelve matches are made up by a single round robin, consisting of an even number of six home and six away matches against all the sides from the other pools. 

There is only one main league table (the conference system used in previous Pro14 years has been dropped). The top eight sides in the table will qualify for the quarter finals, followed by semi-finals and a grand final, with teams seeded 1 to 4 with home advantage for the lowest seeded side.

A total of eight sides will also qualify for the following season's European Rugby Champions Cup, but by a slightly different distribution method, while the remaining eight sides will qualify for the EPCR Challenge Cup. All points won in the competition contributed to rankings in the regional pools, with the top side in each regional pool automatically qualifying for the European Rugby Champions Cup. The remaining four places went then go to the winners of the URC, the European Champions Cup and the European Challenge Cup, (if either or both of the European champions is a URC team that is not already qualified as URC Champion or URC Regional Shield winner) followed then by the highest ranked teams in the main table (who haven't already qualified by other means). A similar format was used to determine playoff contenders in the Super Rugby competition.

Teams

United Rugby Championship

Locations

Regional Pools and European qualification 
The Regional pools of the regular season are the primary mechanism by which teams qualify for European competition, with the 'winner' of each regional pool guaranteed qualification for the European Rugby Champions Cup, ensuring at least one South African, one Welsh and one Irish side qualify for the premier European competition. As Scotland and Italy are sharing a single regional pool, at least one team from those two countries combined is also guaranteed entry, but neither country individually is so guaranteed. The remaining four places will be awarded to those with the four best overall regular season records, regardless of which pool they take part in. As such, it is possible that a team will qualify for the ERCC without reaching the URC play-offs by topping its pool, but finishing ninth or lower overall. If the club that wins the URC championship has not qualified for the Champions Cup on the above criteria, it will qualify instead of the last of the qualified teams that did not win its pool. The same will apply if a URC team wins the 2022-2023 Champions Cup or Challenge Cup and qualifies for the 2023-2024 Champions Cup without having qualified by its league position.

Priority order for European Champions Cup Qualification is therefore :

 2022-23 United Rugby Championship champion
 the four URC Shield winners (if not already qualified as URC Champion)
 the European Rugby Champions Cup champion (if a URC team but not already qualified as above)
 the European Rugby Challenge Cup champion (if a URC team but not already qualified as above)
 the next highest-ranked teams during regular season play not already qualified as above, until eight overall qualifiers have been selected (between 1 and 4 can qualify under this head). 

In theory, a team as high as third overall could therefore fail to qualify for the Champions Cup if it fails to win any of the four available titles (URC, its Regional Shield, Champions or Challenge Cup), and they are all won by much lower ranked URC teams, while the team in last place, if it wins a European competition, can qualify for the following year's Champions Cup. In practice, a team may qualify from an overall 9th or 10th position as the shield winner in a weak regional pool, but derby matches tend to ensure

All 16 teams, however, are guaranteed entry into one of the two competitions. The lowest a team can finish overall while winning its URC shield and qualifying for the Champions Cup is thirteenth.

League standings

The overall United Rugby Championship table is the central pillar of the regular season, and the mechanism by which the teams qualifying for the Championship play-off bracket are decided. The top eight teams in the table at the end of the regular season, regardless of regional pool, qualify for the play-off quarter-finals, seeded in the order they finished the regular season.

Regular season

Round 1

Round 2

Round 3

Round 4

Round 5

Round 6

Round 7

Round 8

Round 9

Round 10

Round 11

Round 12

Round 13

Round 1 (rescheduled match)

Round 14

Round 6 (rescheduled matches)

Round 15

Round 16

Round 17

Round 18

Knockout stage

Bracket

Attendances by club

Notes

References

External links
Official website

2022-23
 
2022–23 in Irish rugby union
2022–23 in Italian rugby union
2022–23 in Scottish rugby union
2022–23 in Welsh rugby union
2022 in South African rugby union
2023 in South African rugby union
Current rugby union seasons